Lycée Jacques Prevert may refer to:

France:
 Lycée Jacques Prevert - Boulogne-Billancourt, Hauts-de-Seine (Paris area)
 Lycée Jacques Prévert - Fontaine
 Lycée Jacques Prevert - Longjumeau, Essonne (Paris area)
 Lycée Jacques Prévert - Savenay
 Lycée Jacques Prévert - Pont-Audemer
 Lycée Jacques Prevert - Taverny, Val-d'Oise (Paris area)

Haiti:
 Lycée Jacques Prevert - Miragoâne, Nippes